Lords of Chaos is a 2018 biographical horror thriller film directed by Jonas Åkerlund and written by Lillie Rammal, Dennis Magnusson, and Åkerlund. Adapted from the 1998 book of the same name, the film is a historical fiction account of the early 1990s Norwegian black metal scene told from the perspective of Mayhem co-founder Euronymous. It stars Rory Culkin as Euronymous, Emory Cohen as Varg Vikernes, Jack Kilmer as Dead, and Sky Ferreira as Ann-Marit.

The film premiered at the Sundance Film Festival on 23 January 2018. It was released in the United States on 8 February 2019 by Gunpowder & Sky, in the United Kingdom on 29 March 2019 by Arrow Films and in Sweden on 5 April 2019 by Nordisk Film. It received positive reviews from critics, but was met with polarizing reception from audiences within the metal community.

Plot
In 1987, a young guitarist called Euronymous forms a black metal band called Mayhem, the first of the genre in their country of Norway, with Necrobutcher on bass, and  Manheim on drums. Manheim leaves and is soon replaced by new drummer Hellhammer and they recruit a new vocalist from Sweden called Dead, who exhibits self-destructive behavior, during their live shows cutting himself and bleeding on the audience and throwing pig heads at the "posers". At a show filmed by their friend Metalion, the band meets a fan named Kristian, whom Euronymous initially looks down on.

While home alone, Dead uses his personal knife to cut his arms and throat, and then uses Euronymous' shotgun to shoot himself in the forehead, leaving behind a suicide note. Euronymous returns home and finds the body but instead of calling the police, he takes photos of the body and moves the knife and shotgun around. After Dead's body is taken to the morgue, Euronymous gives necklaces to the other band members which he claims are pieces of Dead's skull; this disgusts Necrobutcher, prompting him to leave the band.

Soon after, Euronymous starts his own black metal record label and opens a record shop called Helvete ("Hell"), which becomes a social hub for black-metallers like Metalion, Fenriz of Darkthrone, Faust of Emperor, and Kristian (who is now calling himself Varg Vikernes) of Burzum. They become known as the "Black Circle". After being mocked by Euronymous, the very anti-Christian Varg burns down a local church. When challenged by Varg concerning his status as the leader of the Black Circle, Euronymous burns down a church with Faust and Varg accompanying.

Euronymous recruits Varg as bassist, a guitarist called Blackthorn and a Hungarian vocalist, Attila Csihar, to record Mayhem's first album, De Mysteriis Dom Sathanas. A power dispute between Varg and Euronymous arises.

After a wave of church burnings begins, Faust brutally kills a gay man, leading police to link black-metallers to the crimes. Helvete is shut down and Varg is arrested as prime suspect after an interview with a Bergen newspaper in which he boasts of the crimes. He is soon released for lack of evidence. Varg tells Euronymous that he is leaving Mayhem and is starting his own record label. Euronymous reveals that the "skull piece" necklaces were fakes, and that he never intended anyone to follow through on his angry rhetoric, which infuriates Varg.

While packing away things in the shop, Euronymous angrily rants to a peer about wanting to kill Varg, but later calms down and sends him a contract to release their music rights to him. Varg, having heard that Euronymous was making death threats against him, travels to Oslo in the early morning of August 10 to confront him. Telling Euronymous he wants to sign the contract, he enters his apartment and, after a brief conversation, stabs him. Euronymous pleads for his life, but Varg follows him through the apartment to the stairwell outside and stabs him to death. The next day, the news of Euronymous' murder spreads throughout Norway and Varg is soon arrested. He is sent to prison for a maximum of 21 years, guilty of both the murder of Euronymous and the burning of several churches. In a voice-over, Euronymous tells the audience not to feel sorry for him, that he enjoyed his life and invented a new sub-genre of metal.

Cast

Production
Lords of Chaos is based on the 1998 book of the same name. Originally, Japanese director Sion Sono was set to direct a film based on the book, with Jackson Rathbone starring as Varg Vikernes. It would have been Sono's first English-language film. The screenplay was written by Hans Fjellestad (who was earlier reported to be the film's director as well), Ryan Page, Adam Parfrey (the book's publisher), and Sono. In July 2009, Sono stated that filming (in Norway) would begin in August or September and end in December. The film was set to be released in 2010. It was later announced that Rathbone would no longer be playing Vikernes due to scheduling conflicts.

In May 2015, it was announced that former Bathory drummer and film director Jonas Åkerlund would direct the film. The film was set to shoot in the fall of 2015 in Norway, but for unknown reasons, filming did not begin until 2016. Rory Culkin said that he had lost faith in the film coming out in the years between the first announcement and even cut his hair he had grown for the role, only for two weeks later to get confirmation on production starting. Hungarian black metal band Bornholm served as consultants for the film, helping teach Culkin and the other actors the techniques for their playing to look believable.

The film was shot in Oslo, Norway, with live performance scenes shot in Budapest, Hungary. The live sequences shoot also included filming for the Metallica music video "ManUNkind", starring the cast of the film. The burning churches, which were in a scale of half the size of the originals, were built out of the wood from the sets of Blade Runner 2049, which was also filming in Budapest.

Vikernes, who had already expressed criticisms against the book, stated in a video uploaded to his YouTube channel in 2016 that when approached by the filmmakers, he, along with Mayhem and Darkthrone, denied the rights for their music to be used in the film. In a 2018 interview, Åkerlund said that they had in fact secured the rights to Mayhem's music.

Historical accuracy
Åkerlund described the film as "about truth and lies". In an interview for Dazed, it was reported that Åkerlund consulted "original band merch ... was granted access to key police reports as well as detailed photos of Euronymous's record store Helvete, and the house the band camped out in. ... Åkerlund even used real locations for exterior shots of, among others, Euronymous's flat and a rebuilt church that Vikernes burnt down in Holmenkollen."

Culkin said that he prepared for his role by consulting several associates of Euronymous: "They almost always compared him to a mythological creature: one person said he was kind of like a gnome and another said he was like an evil elf. Because he was small dude but confident in himself and he has this clan around him, people really embellished and lionised him."

In one scene from the film, Dead anachronistically declares, "We are Lords of Chaos." The name actually originates from the unrelated American criminal group whose name was adopted for the book Lords of Chaos. The book's scope was not focused solely on the Norwegian black metal scene.

Jack Kilmer's performance as the band's frontman Dead has received praise for being the most accurate portrayal in the film, with the exception of one scene where he has a cat hanging from his room. The real Dead never killed any cats but did chase them off for fun. Some criticisms were made that the Live in Jessheim scene jumps to Dead's suicide, given a whole year had passed in between both events and Dead and Euronymous' subsequent falling out and animosity was never portrayed apart from one scene in which Euronymous mockingly waves a shotgun in front of Dead and suggests he shoots himself. The time Varg claims Dead stabbed Euronymous was never portrayed in the film.

Release and reception
The first screening on Lords of Chaos was held at the Sundance Film Festival on 23 January 2018 in Park City, Utah. In October 2018, a first-quarter 2019 release window for the United States was announced, with Arrow Films securing the distribution rights in the United Kingdom, where it was released on 29 March 2019. The film was released in the US in theaters on 8 February 2019 and via video on demand on 22 February 2019 by Gunpowder & Sky. In Sweden, it was released on 5 April 2019 by Nordisk Film.

Critical reception
The site's critics consensus states: "Lords of Chaos presents a grimly compelling dramatization of a real-life music scene whose aggressively nihilistic aesthetic spilled over into fatal acts of violence." On Metacritic, the film has a weighted average score of 48 out of 100, based on 17 critics, indicating "mixed or average reviews".

In his review for The Hollywood Reporter, Justin Lowe praised Lords of Chaos as a "vibrant biopic" that "provokes both awe and repulsion". Amy Nicholson of Variety wrote, "Despite Åkerlund's refusal to lionize these immature kids, Lords of Chaos is tremendous fun. ... he can also get great performances out of a young cast". IndieWires Michael Nordine awarded the film a B rating and wrote "Lords of Chaos is frequently unpleasant but oddly compelling—not least because Åkerlund ensures that the film never takes itself as seriously as its subjects did."

Conversely, The A.V. Clubs Katie Rife decried that "Åkerlund's understanding [of the Norwegian black metal scene] is more like contempt". Kory Grow of Rolling Stone wrote: "perhaps the film's worst sin is its tone ... It's not fun. It's not sad. A lot of the time, it's not even all that interesting." Robert Ham of Consequence wrote that "Instead of courting [the black metal] audience, or trying to find some middle ground where [Åkerlund] celebrates the music while rightfully disparaging the actions of some of its worst figureheads, he punches down with a smirk and dismisses the birth of a genre as the product of misspent youth."

The New York Times Manohla Dargis criticised the film for "never establish[ing] a coherent or interesting point of view. The tone unproductively veers from the goofy to the creepy, which creates a sense that [Åkerlund] was still figuring it out in the editing." Robert Abele of the Los Angeles Times summarized, "Ultimately it all adds up to a hodgepodge of styles and attitudes with hardly any insight into what made this corrosive clique so magnetic to its adherents."

Reactions from the depicted
Attila Csihar, in a January 2019 interview, stated that the official opinion of the current Mayhem members regarding the film and its creators is a "big fuck you". He pointed out that the film was based on a book and only focused on Mayhem during the 1990s, not the whole black metal scene at the time. He confirmed that some Tormentor songs appear in the film and that he himself is played by his son, Arion Csihar. Attila himself was present during the shooting of the church burning scenes. In a later interview in May 2019, he offered a more nuanced critique of the film, saying that while the film is based on reality, he disagrees with how the story was presented, and that the characters were portrayed as "idiots".

Vikernes harshly criticised the film as "made-up crap", objecting to being portrayed by a Jewish actor and to plot elements, calling the depiction "character murder".

Necrobutcher has provided ambivalent reactions after viewing the film: he praised the production values and the wardrobe accuracy, but noted that the movie was "sad" and "not a good movie", and that viewing the murder scenes had an emotional effect on him. He also addressed Mayhem's initial negative reaction to the announcement of the film, and explained that their intense negative reaction was largely because the band has only been approached after production on the film has started, and that he gave permission to use Mayhem's music in the film after seeing a rough cut. Ultimately he noted that the film had very little impact on the band.

See also
 Until the Light Takes Us, 2008 documentary film about the Norwegian black metal scene
 Murder of Euronymous

Notes

References

External links
 
 
 
 
 

2018 films
2018 horror thriller films
2018 independent films
2010s American films
2010s British films
2010s English-language films
2010s Swedish films
American biographical films
American horror thriller films
American rock music films
Biographical films about musicians
Black metal
British biographical films
British horror thriller films
British rock music films
English-language Swedish films
Films about musical groups
Films about religion
Films about secret societies
Films about terrorism
Films based on non-fiction books
Films directed by Jonas Åkerlund
Films set in the 1980s
Films set in 1991
Films set in 1992
Films set in 1993
Films set in Norway
Films shot in Budapest
Films shot in Oslo
Heavy metal films
Horror films based on actual events
Mayhem (band)
Swedish biographical films
Swedish horror thriller films
Thriller films based on actual events